Motherland is the place of one's birth, the place of one's ancestors, or the place of origin of an ethnic group.

Motherland may also refer to:

Music
 "Motherland" (anthem), the national anthem of Mauritius
 National Song (Montserrat), also called "Motherland"
 Motherland (Natalie Merchant album), 2001
 Motherland (Arsonists Get All the Girls album), 2011
 Motherland (Daedalus album), 2011
 "Motherland" (Crystal Kay song), 2004

Film and television
 Motherland (1927 film), a 1927 British silent war film
 Motherland (2010 film), a 2010 documentary film 
 Motherland (2015 film), a 2015 Turkish drama
 Motherland (TV series), a 2016 British television series
 Motherland: Fort Salem, a 2020 American science fiction drama series

Other uses
 Motherland Party (disambiguation), the name of several political groups
Personifications of Russia, including a list of monuments called Motherland

See also